Gerardo Silva Escudero (born September 21, 1965) is a Mexican football manager and former player. He played for Tampico Madero in the 1994-95 season.

References

External links

1965 births
Living people
Association football midfielders
Santos Laguna footballers
C.D. Guadalajara footballers
Club América footballers
Tampico Madero F.C. footballers
Club Puebla players
Liga MX players
Mexican football managers
San Luis F.C. managers
Footballers from San Luis Potosí
People from San Luis Potosí City
Mexican footballers